William Franklin Finley (September 20, 1940 – April 14, 2012) was an American actor who appeared in the films Simon, Silent Rage, Phantom of the Paradise, Sisters and The Wedding Party.

Finley had a long-running friendship and collaboration with director Brian De Palma, beginning with the student films Woton's Wake (1962), The Wedding Party (1966) and Murder à la Mod (1968). He also had roles in three films by Tobe Hooper: Eaten Alive, The Funhouse and Night Terrors. Under the name W. Franklin Finley, he wrote the screenplay for the film The First Time (1983). He was also the co-author of the book Racewalking (1985).

Personal life
Finley graduated from Columbia University in 1963. He married Susan Weiser in 1975; the couple had one son, Dashiell. The family resided in New York City.

Death 
Finley was diagnosed with an inflamed colon on April 6, 2012. He underwent surgery three days after his admission. He appeared to be doing well after the surgery, but on the morning of April 14, 2012, Finley died aged 71 in New York City.

Filmography

Notes

References

External links
 
 

1940 births
2012 deaths
20th-century American male actors
21st-century American male actors
Male actors from New York City
American male film actors
American male television actors
Columbia University alumni
Sarah Lawrence College alumni